Miasteczko Krajeńskie  is a town in Piła County, Greater Poland Voivodeship, in west-central Poland. It is the seat of the gmina (administrative district) called Gmina Miasteczko Krajeńskie.

The town has a population of 1,163.

Miasteczko is a former private town, once located in the Kalisz Voivodeship in the Greater Poland Province of the Kingdom of Poland. The adjective Krajeńskie was added to the name after the ethnocultural region of Krajna, within which it is located.

Polish folk hero Michał Drzymała is buried at the local cemetery.

References

Cities and towns in Greater Poland Voivodeship
Piła County